Ivanovka is a rural locality (a selo) and the administrative center of Ivanovsky Selsoviet of Zeysky District, Amur Oblast, Russia. The population was 297 as of 2018. There are 12 streets.

Geography 
Ivanovka is located on the left bank of the Urkan River, 46 km southwest of Zeya (the district's administrative centre) by road. Ovsyanka is the nearest rural locality.

References 

Rural localities in Zeysky District